Mantek is a surname. Notable people with the surname include:

Frank Mantek (born 1959), German weightlifter
Stephanie Mantek (born 1971), German weightlifter

See also
Manek